The Best of Nek: L'anno zero is the first greatest hits album by Italian singer-songwriter Nek, released on 10 October 2003.

Background
This album includes the best hits of ten years' career of Nek. Album also includes two new tracks: "Almeno stavolta" and "L'anno zero". Three tracks, "In te", "Cuori in tempesta" and "Angeli nel ghetto", has been released in new versions. Track "Sei solo tu", like in its studio album Le cose da difendere, has been released without vocal of Laura Pausini.

Although the album and single "Almeno stavolta" were released in October of the same year, the national, European and Latin American tour were held in 2004, after two years of live performance inactivity. Nek called the album "l'anno zero" (in English: "year zero") as it marks the end of a period in his career, not only because he matured and found more than ever how music can influence people's thinking, but felt dissatisfaction with his then on-going commercialization of career, with many and dinamic concerts to reduce the intimate relationship between the artist and the audience. At the time of the year or two of public inactivity, he traveled all over the world, especially on the Americas.

The song "Almeno stavolta" was a highly popular song, it peaked at number five on the charts and remained in the Top 10 for 12 weeks.

Reception

The album is generally positively received. Marisa Brown, of Allmusic, said that it begins with, at the time, "two new tracks, "Almeno Stavolta" and "L'Anno Zero," but then moves immediately into a chronological overview of Nek's repertoire, beginning with his first single, "In Te," which he presented at Sanremo in 1993, and going all the way to "Cielo e Terra," which appeared on his 2002 album, Le cose da difendere". Brown, who gave the album a four out of five stars rating, concluded that the new "bonus tracks, while both good and very much in the vein of what Nek has done and continues to do in the 21st century, might not be enough to warrant a purchase for someone who already owns all his other albums", "but for someone who's heard the singles and wants a more comprehensive understanding of the artist, it is a very good buy".

Track listing

Charts and certifications

Peak positions

Certifications

References

2003 greatest hits albums
Nek albums